Newlai Tingkhatra (1953-2014), was an Indian politician from Arunachal Pradesh. He was elected to the Arunachal Pradesh Legislative Assembly from Kanubari Assembly constituency in 1999, 2004, 2009 and 2014 Arunachal Pradesh Legislative Assembly election as a member of Indian National Congress. Tingkhatra has also served as a Cabinet Minister in Arunachal Pradesh Legislative Assembly before passing away from heart attack in 2014.

References

People from Longding district
Naga people
Arunachal Pradesh MLAs 2009–2014
Arunachal Pradesh MLAs 2004–2009
Arunachal Pradesh MLAs 1999–2004
Arunachal Pradesh MLAs 2014–2019
1953 births
2014 deaths
Indian National Congress politicians from Arunachal Pradesh